Kentucky Route 1865 (KY 1865) is a  state highway in the U.S. state of Kentucky. Its southern terminus is at KY 2055 in Louisville and its northern terminus is at U.S. Route 60 Alternate (US 60 Alt.) in Louisville.

Major junctions

References

1865
1865
Transportation in Louisville, Kentucky